Karen Sargsyan may refer to:
 Karen Sargsyan (conductor), Armenian choirmaster and conductor
 Karen Sargsyan (footballer), Russian footballer
 Karen Grigory Sargsyan, Minister of Internal Affairs of the Republic of Artsakh